The Mausoleum Complex of Ziaur Rahman is a significant architectural engineering monument located in Sher-e-Bangla Nagar of Dhaka city in Bangladesh. The monument hosts the grave of Ziaur Rahman, the 7th president of Bangladesh, who is famous for reading proclamation of Bangladeshi Independence through Kalurghat radio centre on 27 March 1971. He was a notable Leader in the south Asian region of the 20th century. The monument was constructed by GBB Limited with consultation of Bashat Architects Engineers Ltd and executed under the Public works department and department of architecture.

History 
The mausoleum of Ziaur Rahman is often known as Zia uddan. Ziaur Rahman was the 7th President of Bangladesh. He was an army general turned politician. He became President of Bangladesh on 21 April 1977, he was assassinated on 30 May 1981 in Chittagong by Bangladeshi army personnel. The president of Bangladesh, Ziaur Rahman, has been assassinated in the south-eastern city of Chittagong. President Zia is believed to have died at 0430 local time when rebels stormed the Chittagong Circuit House. He is reported to have been killed by sub-machine-gun bullets when he opened the door of his room to see what was happening outside. Eight people are thought to have died in the shooting, including a security officer, an officer who was guarding the president and one of the attackers. Later the burial was relocated from Chittagong to parliament area.

Location 
The Mausoleum Complex of Shaheed President Ziaur Rahman is located in Chandrima Uddan, which is located to the north of the Jatiya Sangsad Bhaban and the east of the Ganabhaban, Prime Minister's residence. After the relocation of the burial the Chandrima Udddan become Zia Uddan.

Structure 
The entire structure of Mausoleum Complex is of 74 acres which is divided into 7 partitions;

Mausoleum 
The center of the complex is the grave of Gen; Ziaur Rahman, the width of this tomb is 30 feet, which consist of Black And white marble stone in a circled way. Around the tomb there are four wall with engraved Arabic writings, which upholds the roof (of glass and steel) of the mausoleum.

Approach Bridge 

The approach Bridge is the main entrance point of the Mausoleum complex, it is a rainbow shaped suspended bridge, which is constructed right in middle of Mausoleum. The surface of the bridge has glass marble engraved in it. There is another bridge which can be accessible from the side of Ministry of defense's office.

Memorial Hall 

The memorial hall is at the end of the complex, which is a two-story building. The upper floor is a mosque and lower floor contains restroom, archive library and hundred person's seminar hall.

West Chattar 
There are two Chattar in Zia uddan. West Chattar is situated in west side of Uddan. One of the Chattar has one cafeteria.

East Chattar 

There are two Chattar in Zia uddan. West Chattar is situated in west side of Uddan.

Crescent Lake 
Crescent lake is like a 180 degree protractor lake. Deep blue water with stairs on one side.

Fountain 

There are two fountains in the lake, both are beside the main approach bridge. They lit on night from the dusk till mid night. The fountains have colorful light for beautification.

Controversy 
In 2018, the housing minister Mosharraf Hossain stated that the government will transfer the complex from the present place to fulfil the original plan of the parliament area by Louis Kahn. The Bangladesh Nationalist Party have given ultimatum regarding the news of relocation of the mausoleum complex.
In 2021, Mozammel Haque MP, the Minister of Liberation War Affairs claimed the mausoleum doesn’t contain the body of Ziaur Rahman and requested DNA tests be conducted to confirm this. He also announced the government's intention to remove all illegal structures from the vicinity of the Jatiya Sangsad Bhaban and implementing the original plan of Louis Kahn.

Vandalism 
On April 29, 2015, a group of unknown people vandalised the tomb. After the incident, six police officers responsible for the protection of the tomb complex were detained.

References 

Ziaur Rahman
Ziaur Rahman
Buildings and structures in Dhaka
Tourist attractions in Dhaka